Jane Jie Sun (born 1969/1970) is a Chinese businesswoman, and the CEO of the Trip.com Group, the largest online travel agency in China, since November 2016.

Early life
Sun earned a bachelor's degree in business from the University of Florida, and master's degree in law (LLM) from Peking University's Law School.

Career
Sun worked for KPMG as an audit manager in Silicon Valley, California for five years. Sun was the head of the SEC and external reporting division of Applied Materials from 1997 to 2005.

Sun joined Ctrip (now known as the Trip.com Group) in 2005 as CFO, rising to COO in May 2012, and CEO in November 2016, when she succeeded the company's founder James Liang.

In her role at Ctrip, she has been credited for her focus on gender equality within the company, with half of Ctrip's employees being women.

Personal life
In 1995, Sun married John Wu, one of Yahoo's earliest employees and later, CTO of Alibaba. They have two children, and live in Shanghai. Wu runs his own investment company, FengHe Fund Management.

References

Ctrip people
Living people
Chinese women chief executives
Chinese chief financial officers
Women chief financial officers
University of Florida alumni
Peking University alumni
Chinese accountants
Businesspeople from Shanghai
KPMG people
20th-century Chinese businesswomen
20th-century Chinese businesspeople
21st-century Chinese businesswomen
21st-century Chinese businesspeople
Year of birth uncertain
Asia Game Changer Award winners
Year of birth missing (living people)